Picodynastornithes is a clade that contains the orders Coraciiformes (rollers and kingfishers) and Piciformes (woodpeckers and toucans). This grouping also has current and historical support from molecular and morphological studies.

References

Neognathae